Darshan Chohan (born 4 November 1995) is an English cricketer. He played four first-class matches for Cambridge University Cricket Club between 2015 and 2018.  He captained the University for the 2018 season.

See also
 List of Cambridge University Cricket Club players

References

External links
 

1995 births
Living people
Singaporean cricketers
Cambridge University cricketers